The Saudi ambassador in Ankara is the official representative of the Government in Riyadh to the Government of Turkey, concurrently he is accredited to Baku (Azerbaijan).

List of representatives

References 

 
Turkey
Saudi Arabia